Oulad Embarek is a town in Béni-Mellal Province, Béni Mellal-Khénifra, Morocco. According to the 2004 census it has a population of 11,906.

The N8 highway connects the town with Beni Mellal in the northeast.

References

Populated places in Béni Mellal Province